Séamus F. Hughes (1 September 1952 – 12 July 2022) was an Irish District Court judge and Fianna Fáil politician.

He was from Westport, County Mayo. Hughes was a solicitor, when he was elected to the 27th Dáil as a Fianna Fáil Teachta Dála (TD) for the Mayo West constituency on his first attempt at the 1992 general election. He lost his seat at the 1997 general election when the constituency was combined with Mayo East and the combined Mayo constituency was reduced to 5 seats. Hughes was then appointed State Solicitor for County Mayo.

Hughes was a District Court judge from 2009 to 2022, sitting in District Court area Number One in County Donegal. He attracted criticism over comments on the ethnic backgrounds of those before him in court, having described some as "neanderthals" and commented on social welfare being like "snuff at a wake".

References

1952 births
2022 deaths
Fianna Fáil TDs
District Court (Ireland) judges
Irish solicitors
Members of the 27th Dáil
Politicians from County Mayo
Local councillors in County Mayo
People from Westport, County Mayo